André Campos Moreira (born 2 December 1995) is a Portuguese professional footballer who plays as a goalkeeper for Swiss club Grasshopper Club Zürich.

Club career
Born in Ribeirão, Vila Nova de Famalicão, Moreira was a G.D. Ribeirão youth graduate. He made his senior debut for the club on 29 December 2013, coming on as a substitute for injured Paulo Cunha in a 2–3 home loss against A.D. Oliveirense for the Campeonato Nacional de Seniores.

In August 2014, after impressing with the Portuguese under-19 team at the 2014 UEFA European Championship, Moreira was sold to Jorge Mendes' GestiFute and signed a six-year deal with Atlético Madrid. He was immediately loaned to Primeira Liga side Moreirense FC, making his professional debut on 28 December 2014 by starting in a 2–0 home victory over F.C. Arouca for that season's Taça da Liga.

Moreira joined C.F. União on 1 July 2015, in a season-long loan. He made his debut in the top flight on 16 August, in a 2–1 local derby defeat of C.S. Marítimo.

On 3 August 2016, Moreira was loaned to fellow league club C.F. Os Belenenses. His loan was cancelled 14 days later, after the injury of Miguel Ángel Moyá. He only managed one bench appearance during his very brief spell with the former, in a league game at Vitória de Setúbal.

Moreira split 2017–18 between S.C. Braga and Belenenses, only managing to appear for the latter side. On 1 August 2018, he signed for English Championship club Aston Villa on loan for the campaign, making his competitive debut 13 days later away against Yeovil Town in the first round of the EFL Cup and saving a penalty from Alex Fisher in a 1–0 win.

On 23 January 2019, Moreira returned to Atlético Madrid when his spell at Villa Park was prematurely ended without one single league appearance to his credit. The same day, still owned by the Spaniards, he joined C.D. Feirense for five months.

On 17 July 2019, after five years linked to Atlético without any appearances for them, Moreira terminated his contract and signed for Belenenses SAD on a permanent three-year deal.

International career
Moreira represented Portugal at the 2015 FIFA U-20 World Cup. He played all matches in New Zealand, helping his country reach the quarter-finals.

Moreira's first and only cap for the under-21s occurred on 11 October 2016, in a 7–1 friendly rout of Liechtenstein.

Career statistics

Club

Honours
Individual
UEFA European Under-19 Championship Team of the Tournament: 2014

References

External links

Portuguese League profile 

1995 births
Living people
People from Vila Nova de Famalicão
Sportspeople from Braga District
Portuguese footballers
Association football goalkeepers
Primeira Liga players
Campeonato de Portugal (league) players
G.D. Ribeirão players
Moreirense F.C. players
C.F. União players
C.F. Os Belenenses players
S.C. Braga players
C.D. Feirense players
Belenenses SAD players
Atlético Madrid footballers
Aston Villa F.C. players
Swiss Super League players
Grasshopper Club Zürich players
Portugal youth international footballers
Portugal under-21 international footballers
Portuguese expatriate footballers
Expatriate footballers in Spain
Expatriate footballers in England
Expatriate footballers in Switzerland
Portuguese expatriate sportspeople in Spain
Portuguese expatriate sportspeople in England
Portuguese expatriate sportspeople in Switzerland